Dutch Fork is a  long 3rd order tributary to Buffalo Creek in Washington County, Pennsylvania.

Variant names
According to the Geographic Names Information System, it has also been known historically as:
Dutch Fork of Buffalo Creek

Course
Dutch Fork rises about 0.25 miles east of Claysville, Pennsylvania, in Washington County and then flows west and north to join Buffalo Creek about 0.5 miles southeast of Dunsfort.

Watershed
Dutch Fork drains  of area, receives about 40.5 in/year of precipitation, has a wetness index of 306.89, and is about 62% forested.

See also
List of Pennsylvania Rivers

References

Rivers of Pennsylvania
Rivers of Washington County, Pennsylvania